Willowcreek is an unincorporated village in Malheur County, Oregon, United States. The village has a combined store and café, and the region's elementary school. Today Willowcreek has a Vale mailing address, although the nearest post office is in nearby Jamieson.

The village took its name from Willow Creek, a prominent stream of the county that is a tributary of the Malheur River. The Union Pacific (UP) station here was named Lancaster (or Lancaster Station) after Lancaster, Pennsylvania. The station was on UP's Brogan Line, which was removed by UP. It was named by Brogan namesake D. M. Brogan, who was born in the Pennsylvania city. Willowcreek post office had been established in 1937 but was discontinued by 1980.

Education
Willowcreek Elementary School is part of the Vale School District. The same district operates Vale High School, its only high school.

References

Unincorporated communities in Malheur County, Oregon
1937 establishments in Oregon
Unincorporated communities in Oregon